The Cheirogaleidae are the family of strepsirrhine primates containing the various dwarf and mouse lemurs. Like all other lemurs, cheirogaleids live exclusively on the island of Madagascar.

Characteristics
Cheirogaleids are smaller than the other lemurs and, in fact, they are the smallest primates. They have soft, long fur, colored grey-brown to reddish on top, with a generally brighter underbelly. Typically, they have small ears, large, close-set eyes, and long hind legs. Like all strepsirrhines, they have fine claws at the second toe of the hind legs. They grow to a size of only 13 to 28 cm, with a tail that is very long, sometimes up to one and a half times as long as the body. They weigh no more than 500 grams, with some species weighing as little as 60 grams.

Dwarf and mouse lemurs are nocturnal and arboreal. They are excellent climbers and can also jump far, using their long tails for balance. When on the ground (a rare occurrence), they move by hopping on their hind legs. They spend the day in tree hollows or leaf nests. Cheirogaleids are typically solitary, but sometimes live together in pairs.

Their eyes possess a tapetum lucidum, a light-reflecting layer that improves their night vision. Some species, such as the lesser dwarf lemur, store fat at the hind legs and the base of the tail, and hibernate. Unlike lemurids, they have long upper incisors, although they do have the comb-like teeth typical of all strepsirhines. They have the dental formula: 

Cheirogaleids are omnivores, eating fruits, flowers and leaves (and sometimes nectar), as well as insects, spiders, and small vertebrates.

The females usually have three pairs of nipples. After a meager 60-day gestation, they will bear two to four (usually two or three) young. After five to six weeks, the young are weaned and become fully mature near the end of their first year or sometime in their second year, depending on the species. In human care, they can live for up to 15 years, although their life expectancy in the wild is probably significantly shorter.

Classification
The five genera of cheirogaleids contain 42 species.

 Infraorder Lemuriformes
 Family Cheirogaleidae
 Genus Cheirogaleus: dwarf lemurs
 Montagne d'Ambre dwarf lemur, Cheirogaleus andysabini
 Furry-eared dwarf lemur, Cheirogaleus crossleyi
 Groves' dwarf lemur, Cheirogaleus grovesi
 Lavasoa dwarf lemur, Cheirogaleus lavasoensis
 Greater dwarf lemur, Cheirogaleus major
 Fat-tailed dwarf lemur, Cheirogaleus medius
 Lesser iron-gray dwarf lemur, Cheirogaleus minusculus
 Ankarana dwarf lemur, Cheirogaleus shethi
 Sibree's dwarf lemur, Cheirogaleus sibreei
 Thomas' dwarf lemur, Cheirogaleus thomasi
 Genus Microcebus: mouse lemurs
Arnhold's mouse lemur, Microcebus arnholdi
 Madame Berthe's mouse lemur, Microcebus berthae
 Bongolava mouse lemur Microcebus bongolavensis
 Boraha mouse lemur Microcebus boraha
 Danfoss' mouse lemur Microcebus danfossi
 Ganzhorn's mouse lemur. Microcebus ganzhorni
 Gerp's mouse lemur. Microcebus gerpi
 Reddish-gray mouse lemur, Microcebus griseorufus
 Jolly's mouse lemur, Microcebus jollyae
 Jonah's mouse lemur, Microcebus jonahi
 Goodman's mouse lemur, Microcebus lehilahytsara
 MacArthur's mouse lemur, Microcebus macarthurii
 Claire's mouse lemur, Microcebus mamiratra, synonymous to M. lokobensis
 Bemanasy mouse lemur, Microcebus manitatra
 Margot Marsh's mouse lemur, Microcebus margotmarshae
 Marohita mouse lemur, Microcebus marohita
 Mittermeier's mouse lemur, Microcebus mittermeieri
 Gray mouse lemur, Microcebus murinus
 Pygmy mouse lemur, Microcebus myoxinus
 Golden-brown mouse lemur, Microcebus ravelobensis
 Brown mouse lemur, Microcebus rufus
 Sambirano mouse lemur, Microcebus sambiranensis
 Simmons' mouse lemur, Microcebus simmonsi
 Anosy mouse lemur. Microcebus tanosi
 Northern rufous mouse lemur, Microcebus tavaratra
 Genus Mirza: giant mouse lemurs
 Coquerel's giant mouse lemur or Coquerel's dwarf lemur, Mirza coquereli
 Northern giant mouse lemur, Mirza zaza
 Genus Allocebus
 Hairy-eared dwarf lemur, Allocebus trichotis
 Genus Phaner: fork-marked lemurs
 Masoala fork-marked lemur, Phaner furcifer
 Pale fork-marked lemur, Phaner pallescens
 Pariente's fork-marked lemur, Phaner parienti
 Amber Mountain fork-marked lemur, Phaner electromontis

Footnotes
According to the letter of the International Code of Zoological Nomenclature, the correct name for this family should be Microcebidae, but the name Cheirogaleidae has been retained for stability.
In 2008, 7 new species of Microcebus were formally recognized, but Microcebus lokobensis (Lokobe mouse lemur) was not among the additions, even though it was described in 2006. Therefore, its status as a species is still questionable.

References

Lemurs
Primate families
Taxa named by John Edward Gray
Taxa described in 1873